The Astan Quds Razavi Museum in Mashhad, which was founded in 1937, is one of the most significant public museums in Iran. Located in the vicinity of the Holy Shrine of Imam Reza (AS) and Gowharshad Mosque, as two magnificent monuments exemplifying the Islamic art and architecture in the past twelve centuries, the AQR Museum has been visited for almost eight decades by millions of pilgrims and tourists from Iran and other countries throughout the world.

The museum owes its origins to the remarkable collection of artefacts and manuscripts which have been acquired and preserved intact in the treasury of the shrine through the centuries. Moreover, the museum contains both a noticeable collection of articles which were once in use in the shrine and the handicrafts, works of art and the antiquities which have been donated by the devotees of Imam Reza (AS). The records stored in the archives of the AQR Museum, which are relative to such collections, indicate how systematically they have been catalogued by the treasurers in the course of their service.

History of the Museum

Following the inauguration of a museum in the Golestan Palace  in Tehran after Nassereddin Shah Qajar's return from his second European tour, displaying a collection of exquisite objects in a building in the Holy Shrine of Imam Reza (AS) in Mashhad became a major concern for the custodians and the vice custodians of the shrine during the late Qajar period; in so far as this issue was even reflected in the newspapers of the era. But it was not until the years 1925-1935 when Muhammad Wali Assadi, the then vice custodian of the shrine and a key political figure in the early Pahlavi period, administered the whole affairs of Astan Quds Razavi and proposed the idea of establishing a museum after making a new inventory of the objects and manuscripts in the AQR Treasury.

The names of some foreigners who approached him for making a contribution in this regard are observed in the AQR archived documents; M. V. Romanovsky, the then Russian consul in Birjand  and an antique expert, was one of them who wrote letters to Astan Quds Razavi in 1930 and 1932 and expressed his interest and readiness to be of assistance but his offer was refused due to lack of budget and a decent building. Later, Muhammad Wali Assadi managed to set up a commission to decide on an appropriate location and a selection of objects for the museum and this time, Professor Arthur Upham Pope, a reputable American expert on Persian and Islamic art, was invited for consultation. However, the whole plan was delayed once more until a year after Assadi's dethronement.

Later in 1936 and under Fathullah Pakravan's vice custodianship (1935 -1941) of the Holy Shrine of Imam Reza (AS), a collection of exquisite objects was selected and the AQR Museum was incorporated. This was first housed in the upper rooms in the north-west of the New Courtyard  and the south-east of the Old Courtyard   which were interconnected. The records indicate that the collection had been visited by many of the then official authorities, cultivated people and orientalists, namely Professor Walther Hinz (1906–92), professor of Persian Studies at the University of Göttingen in Germany on April 9, 1939 and Badi'ozzamān Foruzānfar, a distinguished professor of Persian Literature at Tehran University on September 20, 1942.

To make more room for the large collection held by the AQR Treasury, the construction of the first museum building began formally on December 5, 1937 in the east side of Gowharshad Mosque and next to the Mausoleum of Sheikh Baha'i  in Pahlavi Courtyard  of the Holy Shrine of Imam Reza (AS). This building, which consisted of a cellar and two floors, was designed by André Godard  and constructed by two engineers 'Kondratieff ' and 'Buick Qahramani' in an area of 1038 square metres. Thus, the first AQR Museum, which had 189 historical objects on display, opened to the public on December 13, 1945.

After 27 years and in accordance with a development plan for the Holy Shrine of Imam Reza (AS), the first AQR Museum building was demolished and its collections were transferred to the reception hall in the south east of the Museum Courtyard in 1972. The collections were provisionally exhibited there until 1977 when a modern five-storey building for the AQR Library, Museum and Storage Rooms was constructed on the east side of the Museum Courtyard. It was constructed by Mahsaz Construction Company in cooperation with an interior design company from France, and Borbor Consulting Group was chosen to supervise the architecture of the project with the assistance of some museum experts from England.

After the Islamic Revolution in 1979, the AQR Library  was gradually transferred to its current location on the west side of Inqilab Islami Courtyard in the holy shrine and the AQR Museum expanded greatly under the custodianship of Ayatollah Abbas Vaez Tabasi (1979-2016). The Museum's collection continual growth throughout the past four decades made it necessary for the AQR administration officials to establish the AQR Museum Department to manage the collections and their visitors.

The Museum Department is currently administered by the Organisation of the Libraries, Museums and Archives of Astan Quds Razavi and comprises three subsidiary offices (the Curatorial Departments, the Research, and the Conservation and Restoration), a reference library, and the following four buildings which are annually visited by millions of pilgrims and tourists.

The Curatorial Departments Office

This office administers seven curatorial departments which exhibit and care for the objects in the AQR Museum.  Ever since the Museum Department's establishment in 2003, the Curatorial Departments Office has supervised the clerical staff and personnel issues, each department's holdings, the museum's revenue and the collections' maintenance.

The Research Office

The AQR Museum is among a few museums in Iran to have a dedicated Research Office. Established in 2003, it works with experts in different fields and a range of external partners on research projects and publications as well as cataloguing and documenting the museum's holdings and acquisitions. 
The Research Office's archives are accessible to Museum staff and to qualified scholarly researchers by appointment and with proper identification.

The Conservation and Restoration Office

Since its founding in 2003, the Conservation and Restoration Office has been responsible for the preservation, investigation and restoration of the AQR Museum's collections. Combining an expert knowledge of material science, outstanding practical expertise and underpinned by scientific analysis and research, the staff in this office are able to identify and interpret deteriorated objects, evaluate the objects' provenance and authenticity, and preserve and restore a wide range of the museum collections.

The AQR Museum's Reference Library

The Reference Library which opened in 1998 is the central research library of Astan Quds Razavi Museum. Its collection of books, periodicals, dissertations, audiovisual and digitized materials on a wide variety of subjects such as Quran manuscripts, Iranian and Islamic calligraphy, the history of art, astronomy, arms and armor, porcelain, Islamic art and architecture, seashells and marine animals, philately and postal history, numismatics, paper money, museum management, anthropology, etc. has made it one of the most comprehensive in Iran. The primary mission of the library, which is located on the first floor of the Research Office building and contains more than 13000 volumes of books and periodicals, is to support the research activities of the Museum staff; in addition, it welcomes a broad range of students and researchers college age and above.

The AQR Museum Building Number 1 (the Central Museum)

It comprises the following curatorial departments:

 2nd Floor: Astronomical Instruments, Clocks, Arms and Armor, Vessels and Medals
 1st Floor: Visual Arts, Seashells and Marine Animals
 Ground Floor: The History of Razavi Holy Shrine
 Basement 1: Philatelic, Numismatic and Paper Money Collections

The AQR Museum Building Number 2 (The Carpet Department)

The AQR Museum Building Number 3:

 The Department of Quran Manuscript
 The Department of the Exquisite Objects presented by Ayatollah Syed Ali Khamenei
 The Art Gallery of Master Mahmoud Farsh'chian

The AQR Museum Building Number 4 (The Anthropology Department)

References

 The Astan Quds Razavi Museum; Heshmat Kafili, in collaboration with Maryam Habibi Qa'ini By'gi and Muhammad Reza Shahroody Zadeh, First Edition, 2017

Museums in Iran